The 2012–13 EHF Women's Champions League was the 20th edition of the EHF Women's Champions League, the competition for top women's clubs of Europe, organized and supervised by the European Handball Federation. Budućnost Podgorica was title holder, after beating Győri Audi ETO KC in past season's final.

Győri redeemed themselves by winning this season's edition. They defeated Larvik HK 47–43 in the final.

Overview

Format

A few changes had been made in the competition's format. The first qualifying tournament has been deleted. As past season the second qualifying tournament was played under a final four format. A Wild Card Tournament with three teams was organized, the winner were qualified for the Group Phase. In addition, a knock-out match between one team from Pot 1 of the QT2 and a team from Pot 2 of the QT2 was played. The winner also qualified for the Group Phase.

Team allocation
28 teams from 19 federations participated to the Women's Champions League this season. Places were distributed according to the EHF league coefficient, which took into account the performances in European competitions from 2008–09 to 2010–11.

th Title Holder

Round and draw dates
The draws will be held in Vienna, Austria and Herzogenaurach, Germany.

Qualification stage

Qualification tournament
A total of 14 teams took part in the qualification tournaments. The clubs were drawn into three groups of four and played a semifinal and the final. The winner of the qualification groups advanced to the group stage, while the eliminated clubs went to the EHF Cup. Matches were played at 8–9 September 2011. The draw took place on 3 July, at 11:00 local time at Vienna, Austria.

Seedings
The two remaining teams from Pot 1 and 4 played a knock-out match, the winner went into the group stage. The draw was held on 3 July 2012.

Qualification tournament 1
Viborg HK organized the event.

Qualification tournament 2
Byåsen HE organized the event.

Qualification tournament 3
Universitatea Cluj organized the event.

Play-off

Wild card tournament
Issy-Paris Hand organized the event.

Group matches

The draw of the group matches was held on 6 July at the Gartenhotel Altmannsdorf in Vienna. A total of sixteen teams were concerned in the process, to be divided into four pots of four. Teams were divided into four pots, based on EHF coefficients. Clubs from the same pot or the same association could not be drawn into the same group, except the wild card tournament winner, which did not enjoy any protection.

Seedings

Group A

Group B

Group C

Group D

Main round

The draw of the group matches was held on 20 November at the Gartenhotel Altmannsdorf in Vienna. A total of eight teams were concerned in the process, to be divided into two pots of four. Teams were divided into two pots, based on EHF coefficients. Clubs from the same pot or group could not be drawn into the same group.

Seedings

Group 1

Group 2

Knockout stage

Semifinals

|}

Final

|}

Top scorers

Excluding qualifying rounds

References

External links
 

 
Women's EHF Champions League
EHF
EHF